Felicjanów may refer to the following places:
Felicjanów, Łódź East County in Łódź Voivodeship (central Poland)
Felicjanów, Poddębice County in Łódź Voivodeship (central Poland)
Felicjanów, Płock County in Masovian Voivodeship (east-central Poland)
Felicjanów, Koło County in Greater Poland Voivodeship (west-central Poland)
Felicjanów, Turek County in Greater Poland Voivodeship (west-central Poland)